Lewia is a genus of fungi in the family Pleosporaceae.

References

Pleosporaceae
Taxa named by Margaret Elizabeth Barr-Bigelow